Dark Wanton is a 1948 thriller novel by the British writer Peter Cheyney. It was published in the United States under the alternative title Case of the Dark Wanton

Synopsis
In London's West End, two lists of Nazi agents and collaborators, wanted by the Allies for their war crimes, go missing. Intelligence chief Peter Everard Quayle chooses to use agents accustomed to operating behind enemy lines to recover them.

References

Bibliography
 Reilly, John M. Twentieth Century Crime & Mystery Writers. Springer, 2015.

1948 British novels
Novels by Peter Cheyney
British thriller novels
Novels set in London
British spy novels
William Collins, Sons books